Hameh Kasi (also Romanized as Hameh Kasī; also known as Hamakasi and Hamehkasi Shara) is a village in Chah Dasht Rural District, Shara District, Hamadan County, Hamadan Province, Iran. At the 2006 census, its population was 905, in 200 families.

References 

Populated places in Hamadan County